This is a list of diffuse nebulae. Most nebulae are diffuse, meaning they do not have well-defined boundaries. Types of diffuse nebulae include emission nebulae and reflection nebulae

Emission and reflection nebulae

See also
Lists of astronomical objects
List of nebulae

Diffuse nebulae
Diffuse list
Diffuse list